Elisaveta Mileva (born 10 July 1934) is a Bulgarian gymnast. She competed in six events at the 1960 Summer Olympics.

References

1934 births
Living people
Bulgarian female artistic gymnasts
Olympic gymnasts of Bulgaria
Gymnasts at the 1960 Summer Olympics
People from Vratsa